Federica Silvera Arias (born 13 February 1993) is a Uruguayan footballer and futsal player who plays as a forward for Argentine club San Lorenzo de Almagro and the Uruguay women's national team.

International career
Silvera capped for Uruguay during the 2014 Copa América Femenina.

Personal life
Silvera is a supporter of Nacional.

References

External links

1993 births
Living people
Footballers from Montevideo
Uruguayan women's footballers
Women's association football forwards
Women's association football midfielders
Centro Atlético Fénix players
Club Nacional de Football players
San Lorenzo de Almagro footballers
Uruguay women's international footballers
Uruguayan expatriate women's footballers
Uruguayan expatriate sportspeople in Argentina
Expatriate footballers in Argentina
Uruguayan women's futsal players